The 2010 UEFA Super Cup was the 35th UEFA Super Cup, between the reigning champions of the two club competitions organised by the European football governing body UEFA: the UEFA Champions League and the UEFA Europa League. It took place at the Stade Louis II in Monaco on 27 August 2010. It was contested by Inter Milan, who won the 2009–10 UEFA Champions League, and Atlético Madrid, who won the 2009–10 UEFA Europa League. Neither side had previously competed in the UEFA Super Cup. As part of a trial that started in the 2009–10 UEFA Europa League, two extra officials – one on each goal line – were used in this match.

Background
For the first time since Chelsea played Real Madrid in 1998, both teams were playing in their first UEFA Super Cup. Inter Milan reached the Super Cup as winners of the 2009–10 UEFA Champions League, having beaten Bayern Munich 2–0 in the final at the Santiago Bernabéu Stadium in Madrid, while Atlético Madrid beat Fulham 2–1 in the 2010 UEFA Europa League Final at the HSH Nordbank Arena in Hamburg to claim their first major European honour since the 1962 Cup Winners' Cup and their place in the Super Cup. Although the 2009–10 Champions League was not Inter's first European title, the Super Cup was not established until eight years after their last European Cup win in 1965 and the UEFA Cup winners did not qualify for the Super Cup until after the UEFA Cup Winners' Cup was disestablished in 1999 (Inter last won the UEFA Cup in 1998); they have never won the Cup Winners' Cup. Atlético's 1962 Cup Winners' Cup win also came before the establishment of the Super Cup.

Inter and Atlético Madrid had never played against each other in European competition, and both teams had exact 50% records against teams from the other's country: in 37 matches against Spanish opposition, Inter had both won and lost 13 matches, with the remaining 11 ending as draws, while Atlético had won six, lost six and drawn two matches against Italian opposition.

Venue and ticketing
The Stade Louis II in Monaco has been the venue for the UEFA Super Cup every year since 1998. Built in 1985, the stadium is also the home of AS Monaco, who play in the French league system.

Approximately 30% of the 18,500 seats in the stadium were reserved for fans of each of the two teams involved; these tickets were available from the two clubs. Approximately 1,500 of the remaining tickets went on sale to the general public via the UEFA website on 5 July 2010; applications closed on 16 July. If the number of applications exceeds the number of tickets available, a random ballot will occur to determine ticket allocation.

Match

Details

Statistics

See also
Atlético Madrid in European football
Inter Milan in European football

References

External links
2010 UEFA Super Cup, UEFA.com

2010
2010 in Monégasque sport
Super
Super Cup 2010
Super Cup 2010
Super
Super
International club association football competitions hosted by Monaco
August 2010 sports events in Europe